Val-de-Charmey is a municipality in the district of Gruyère in the canton of Fribourg in Switzerland.  On 1 January 2014 the former municipalities of Cerniat and Charmey merged into the municipality of Val-de-Charmey.

History
Cerniat is first mentioned in 1288 as Sernia.  Charmey is first mentioned in 1211 as Chalmeis.  Until 1760 it was known as Feiguières.  The municipality is also informally known by its German name Galmis.

Geography
Of this area, about 43.7% is used for agricultural purposes, while 41.9% is forested. Of the rest of the land, 2.1% is settled (buildings or roads) and 12.2% is unproductive land. Of the agricultural land,  is used for orchards and vineyards,  is fields and grasslands and  consists of alpine grazing areas.

Rivers and lakes cover  in the municipality.

Demographics
, 16.8% of the population are resident foreign nationals. In 2015 a small minority (136 or 5.6% of the population) was born in France. Over the last 6 years (2010-2016) the population has changed at a rate of 11.65%. The birth rate in the municipality, in 2016, was 7.4, while the death rate was 16.9 per thousand residents.

, children and teenagers (0–19 years old) make up 18.8% of the population, while adults (20–64 years old) are 57.5% of the population and seniors (over 64 years old) make up 23.7%.  In 2015 there were 948 single residents, 1,102 people who were married or in a civil partnership, 160 widows or widowers and 206 divorced residents.

In 2016 there were 1,087 private households in Val-de-Charmey with an average household size of 2.19 persons. In 2015 about 61.6% of all buildings in the municipality were single family homes, which is about the same as the percentage in the canton (61.6%) and about the same as the percentage nationally (57.4%).  In 2015 the rate of construction of new housing units per 1000 residents was 3.31.  The vacancy rate for the municipality, was 0.36%.

Historic population
The historical population is given in the following chart:

Heritage sites of national significance
The Chartreuse De La Valsainte, the alpine chalet at Le Lapé 320 and the alpine chalet at Pra de La Monse 249 are listed as Swiss heritage site of national significance.

Economy
Val-de-Charmey is classed as a mixed agro-industrial community, a municipality where agriculture and manufacturing play a significant role in the economy.

, there were a total of 1,095 people employed in the municipality.  Of these, a total of 135 people worked in 39 businesses in the primary economic sector.  The secondary sector employed 328 workers in 48 separate businesses.  Finally, the tertiary sector provided 632 jobs in 128 businesses, of which 205 people worked in large business(es) (50-249 employees).  In 2016 a total of 3.3% of the population received social assistance.

In 2015 the average cantonal, municipal and church tax rate in the municipality for a couple with two children making  was 4.8% while the rate for a single person making  was 19.5%, both of which are close to the average for the canton.  The canton has an average tax rate for those making  and a slightly higher than average rate for those making .

Politics
In the 2015 federal election the most popular party was the CVP with 31.1% of the vote.  The next three most popular parties were the SVP (25.1%), the FDP (21.4%) and the SP (15.4%).  In the federal election, a total of 865 votes were cast, and the voter turnout was 52.3%.

Crime
In 2014 the crime rate, of the over 200 crimes listed in the Swiss Criminal Code (running from murder, robbery and assault to accepting bribes and election fraud), in Val-de-Charmey was 46.7 per thousand residents.  This rate is about 72.3% of the average rate in the entire country.  During the same period, the rate of drug crimes was 3.8 per thousand residents which is only 39.6% of the rate in the canton and 38.4% of the national rate.  The rate of violations of immigration, visa and work permit laws was 5.1 per thousand residents.

References

Municipalities of the canton of Fribourg
Spa towns in Switzerland
Cultural property of national significance in the canton of Fribourg